Oleg Cassini, Inc. is an American fashion house founded by American fashion designer Oleg Cassini. The company is based in Oyster Bay Cove, New York, and was established in 1951.

References

American fashion
Clothing companies of the United States
Companies based in Nassau County, New York
Design companies established in 1951
1951 establishments in New York (state)
Privately held companies based in New York (state)